Eleanor Goss (November 18, 1895 – November 6, 1982) was an American tennis player of the inter-war period. She first drew attention in tennis by winning titles as a student at Wellesley College. She won the US Women's National Championship in women's doubles four times, including three consecutive titles between 1918 and 1920 with Marion Zinderstein.

In 1918, she also reached the women's singles final, where she was beaten by Molla Bjurstedt, and competed at the 1924 Summer Olympics.

Grand Slam finals

Singles (1 runner-up)

Doubles (4 titles, 2 runners-up)

References

External links

 
 

1895 births
1982 deaths
American female tennis players
Tennis players at the 1924 Summer Olympics
Grand Slam (tennis) champions in women's doubles
United States National champions (tennis)
Olympic tennis players of the United States
20th-century American women
20th-century American people
Tennis people from New York (state)